In Aztec mythology, Tlilhua (Nahuatl for "one that has ink") is one of the Centzontotochtin, the gods of pulque.

Aztec pulque gods
Alcohol deities